is a retired Japanese judo and winner of the gold medal at the 1999 World Judo Championships in Birmingham. To Shinohara's disappointment, French champion David Douillet did not compete at Birmingham due to back injury; Shinohara was quoted as saying, "Even though I lifted the double crown at the worlds, it won't mean anything as long as people say it was won in Douillet's absence." Douillet had previously been declared victor at the 1997 championships in Paris after a French judge gave Shinohara a controversial penalty.

Three years after, Shinohara received the silver medal at the 2000 Summer Olympics when he was defeated by Douillet due to another disputed judgment about Uchi Mata Sukashi in the finals which was strongly protested by the Japanese participants. Douillet performed Uchi Mata but over-rotated and landed on his back; Shinohara fell to the mat as well. One judge had ruled for Shinohara, while the other two ruled for Douillet. Shinohara cried throughout the medal ceremony as a result of his loss, while head coach and 1984 Olympic champion Yasuhiro Yamashita harshly criticised the judges and apologized to Shinohara for his powerlessness after the ceremony. However, at a later press conference, Shinohara expressed that he was not dissatisfied with the judgment, stating, "I lost because I was weak. Douillet was strong."

As of 2007, Shinohara coaches judo at his alma mater, Tenri University, where he previously studied as an undergraduate. Among his students is Asian champion Takamasa Anai.

Shinohara portrayed himself in the 2016 game Yakuza Kiwami, serving as a potential opponent for protagonist Kazuma Kiryu.

References

External links

 
 
 Youtube Video (2000 Summer Olympics  blue:Shinohara, white:Douillet)
 Competition videos of Shinichi Shinohara (judovision.org)

1973 births
Living people
Japanese male judoka
Olympic judoka of Japan
Judoka at the 2000 Summer Olympics
Sportspeople from Kobe
Olympic medalists in judo
Asian Games medalists in judo
World judo champions
Judoka at the 1998 Asian Games
Medalists at the 2000 Summer Olympics
Asian Games gold medalists for Japan
Olympic silver medalists for Japan
Medalists at the 1998 Asian Games